Calgary Centre-North (formerly known as Calgary North Centre) was a federal electoral district in Alberta, Canada, that was represented in the House of Commons of Canada from 2004 to 2015. It was a mixed urban and suburban constituency in Calgary – with a dense urban area close to the Bow River in the south and suburbs in the north of the riding, west of Deerfoot Trail and east of Nose Hill Park.

History
This riding was created as "Calgary North Centre" in 2003 from Calgary Centre (38%), Calgary—Nose Hill (38%) and Calgary Northeast (24%).

In 2004, it was renamed "Calgary Centre-North".

In 2013, it was abolished and redistributed into Calgary Confederation (67%) and Calgary Nose Hill (33%) ridings.

Members of Parliament

This riding has elected the following members of the House of Commons of Canada:

Election results

Calgary Centre-North

Calgary North Centre

See also
 List of Canadian federal electoral districts
 Past Canadian electoral districts

References

 
 
2011 results from Elections Canada
 Expenditures - 2008
 Expenditures - 2004

Notes

External links
 2008 Calgary Centre-North Riding Debate ("Round Table") Coverage (MP3, WMV, FLV)
 Website of the Parliament of Canada

Former federal electoral districts of Alberta
Politics of Calgary